Carl Olsson may refer to:

 Carl Olsson (referee) (1892–1971), Swedish football referee
Carl Olsson, Swedish keyboard player with The Bear Quartet
Carl Robert Olsson, athlete
Les Olsson (Carl Lester Olsson), American football player

See also
Carl Olson (disambiguation)
Carl Olsen (disambiguation)
Karl Olsen, Norwegian civil servant